Enex Jean-Charles (born 18 July 1960) is a Haitian politician who served as Prime Minister of Haiti from March 2016 until March 2017.

Career
Jean-Charles was born on 18 July 1960 in Chansolme.

From March 2004 to June 2006 Jean-Charles served as Secretary General of the Council of Ministers under President Boniface Alexandre. Under Alexandre's successor, René Préval, Jean-Charles was a special advisor. He also served as advisor to President Michel Martelly during his term in office (2011–2016).

In March 2016 Jean-Charles was named as designate Minister of Planning and External Cooperation in the cabinet of Fritz Jean. On 22 March 2016 acting President Jocelerme Privert appointed Jean-Charles as Prime Minister by decree. The general policy plan of his predecessor, Fritz Jean, had been rejected by the Chamber of Deputies on 20 March. On 24 March Jean-Charles presented his cabinet. On 25 March Jean-Charles obtained support for both his general policy plan and his cabinet from both Houses of the Haitian Parliament and was confirmed as Prime Minister. On 28 March his government was officially installed. He was succeeded as Prime Minister by Jack Guy Lafontant on 21 March 2017.

Jean-Charles has worked as a professor of administrative law at the University of Haiti since 1991.

Personal life
Jean-Charles is married and has three children.

References

1960 births
21st-century Haitian politicians
Living people
People from Nord-Ouest (department)
Prime Ministers of Haiti
Academic staff of the State University of Haiti